Gilles De Wilde (born 12 October 1999) is a Belgian professional racing cyclist, who currently rides for UCI ProTeam . In September 2020, he rode in the BinckBank Tour in Belgium and the Netherlands.

Major results
2017
 3rd Menen–Kemmel–Menen
2019
 2nd Road race, National Under-23 Road Championships
2022
 1st  Mountains classification, Boucles de la Mayenne
 5th Brussels Cycling Classic

References

External links
 

1999 births
Living people
Belgian male cyclists
Place of birth missing (living people)
21st-century Belgian people